Paul Francis Waldau (born January 16, 1950) is an American ethicist and former professor at Canisius College in Buffalo, New York, where he headed the graduate program on anthrozoology, which he founded. He has several times served as Barker Lecturer in animal law at Harvard Law School, and is the author of a number of books on animal rights and speciesism.

Waldau has also served as the legal director of the Great Ape Project, which campaigns for rights for chimpanzees, gorillas and orangutans.

He has served as President of the Religion and Animals Institute since 2003.

Books
(2001). The Specter of Speciesism: Buddhist and Christian Views of Animals. Oxford University Press.
(ed.) (2006). A Communion of Subjects: Animals in Religion, Science, and Ethics. Columbia University Press.
(ed.) (2008). An Elephant in the Room: The Science and Well-being of Elephants in Captivity. Center for Animals and Public Policy.
(2011). Animal Rights: What Everyone Needs to Know. Oxford University Press.
(forthcoming). The Animal Invitation: Religion, Law, Science and Ethics in a More-Than-Human World.
(2013). Animal Studies: An Introduction. Oxford University Press.

References

Further reading
Koch, John (1 July 2001). "Paul Waldau, Ethicist and Former Lawyer", The Boston Globe.

External links
 

1950 births
Alumni of the University of Oxford
American animal rights scholars
American ethicists
Animal articles needing expert attention
American legal scholars
Canisius College faculty
Ethnobiologists
Harvard Law School faculty
Living people
People from Sherborn, Massachusetts
Place of birth missing (living people)
Stanford University alumni
University of Chicago alumni
University of California, Los Angeles alumni
University of California, Santa Barbara alumni